The 2014 LEN Super Cup was a water polo match organized by LEN and contested by the reigning champions of the two main European club competitions, the 2013-14 LEN Champions League and the 2013-14 LEN Euro Cup, in Barcelona, Spain on 21 November 2014.

Squads
The two squads were CNA Barceloneta and Spartak Volgograd.

CNA Barceloneta

Spartak Volgograd

See also
 2014 Women's LEN Super Cup

References

LEN Super Cup
2014 in water polo